Valence-sur-Baïse (Gascon: Valença de Baïsa) is a commune in the Gers department in southwestern France.

Geography

Population

See also
Communes of the Gers department
 Flaran Abbey
 Baïse

References

Communes of Gers
Gers communes articles needing translation from French Wikipedia